The men's doubles was a tennis event held as part of the Tennis at the 1904 Summer Olympics programme. It was the third time the event was held at the Olympics. There were 30 players from 2 nations, comprising 15 pairs including one mixed team. Only one player was from outside the United States; all medals were won by Americans. The event was won by Edgar Leonard and Beals Wright, defeating Alphonzo Bell and Robert LeRoy in the final. The two bronze medal pairs were Clarence Gamble (tennis)/Arthur Wear and Joseph Wear/Allen West. The medals were the first credited to the United States in the men's doubles, though an American had been part of a silver medal mixed team in 1900.

Background

This was the third appearance of the men's doubles tennis. The event has been held at every Summer Olympics where tennis has been on the program: from 1896 to 1924 and then from 1988 to the current program. A demonstration event was held in 1968.

The competition was largely limited to American players, with only one international entrant. The British brothers Laurence Doherty and Reginald Doherty, 1900 Olympic champions and nearing the conclusion of their eight-year Wimbledon win streak, were notable absences.

The United States and Germany each made their second appearance in the event.

Competition format

The competition was a single-elimination tournament with no bronze-medal match (both semifinal losers tied for third). All matches before the final were best-of-three sets; the final was best-of-five sets. Tiebreaks had not been invented yet.

Schedule

Draw

Results

References

 
  ITF, 2008 Olympic Tennis Event Media Guide

1904

Men's doubles